The China Energy Research Report is one of the leading works of Prof. Dr. Yi-Ming Wei's team in the Center of Energy & Environmental Policy Research. The report is a publication of series in every two years with a specific theme at one time, based on China's critical energy strategies, aiming to provide scientific and technical support for public and private policy decisions. 2014 saw the release of its fifth installment.

Released reports
 China Energy Report (2006): Strategy and Policy Research
 China Energy Report (2008): CO2 Emissions Research
 China Energy Report (2010): Energy Efficiency Research
 China Energy Report (2012): Energy Security Research
 China Energy Report (2014): Energy Poverty Research

Review of reports

China Energy Report (2014): Energy Poverty Research
The 2014 Report is the fifth in a series of such reports. It is based on the fact that China, as the largest developing country, has been challenged with the more serious and more complicated energy poverty issue. This report reviews and summarizes the tools and methods of evaluating the global energy poverty, then establishes an indicator system of measuring and assessing China's energy poverty from a temporal and spatial perspective. Besides, many critical issues like the relations between energy poverty and economic growth, climate change and energy accessibility, clean energy and energy poverty, solid fuels and health, policies and acts on energy poverty elimination, are also discussed in this report.

China Energy Report (2012): Energy Security Research
China has been more relying on the import of fossil fuels since 2009 soon after China became the biggest energy consumer and second largest oil importer, giving rise to more crisis and risks. Under such circumstances, the 2012 Report systematically discusses a series of topics pertaining to energy security, such as the complexity of the global energy market, risks assessment of China's energy import, policies for strategic energy reserves, energy crisis and China's economic growth, renewables and energy poverty, the environmental and health effects of energy consumption, energy conservation potentials for key sectors and regions, energy supply security warning and studies of international energy security.

China Energy Report (2010): Energy Efficiency Research
Energy, followed by CO2 emissions, is not only an environmental problem, but recognized as an economic, political, and social strategic issue. In a global path of sustainable development, it is aware that achieving energy conservation as well as energy efficiency improvements is one of the most important and effective way to address climate change and energy challenges. The 2010 Report proposes the connotation as well as the measurements of energy efficiency based on a comprehensive study of international energy situation. It is well extended to several analyses such as the effects of economic structure on the macro energy efficiency, the difference between urban and rural residential energy consumption and characteristics of regional residential energy consumption, energy efficiency of major industries and sectors, the effects of fuel price on oil demand, energy efficiency policy design, and simulation.

China Energy Report (2008): CO2 Emissions Research
The global climate change has posed a hard question of how to use fossil fuels wisely to human beings. In this context, the 2008 Report focuses on energy use and CO2 emissions. the characteristics of China's energy consumption and CO2 emissions, factors of CO2 emissions under different economic growth levels, the emissions trajectory of China's carbon-intensive sectors and regions, global carbon market, mitigation technologies and policies.

China Energy Report (2006): Strategy and Policy Research
Energy has been considered same as labor and capital, a basic productive factor and strategic resource. The 2006 Report, the first installment of the series, focuses on China's energy strategies and management and provides implications according to different policy portfolios.

References

Y. M. Wei, H. Liao, K. Wang, Y. Hao. China Energy Report (2014): Energy Poverty Research, Science Press, Beijing 240 pages (2014)  (in Chinese).
Y. M. Wei, G. Wu, et al., China Energy Report (2012): Energy Security Research, Science Press, Beijing, 280 pages (2012) (in Chinese).
Y. M. Wei, H. Liao, et al., China Energy Report (2010): Energy Efficiency Research, Science Press, Beijing, 239 pages (2010)  (in Chinese).

Energy in China
Energy research